Ralph Hunt was a founding colonist of what is today known as Long Island.

Biography 
Ralph Hunt was an early colonist in Long Island, New York.  Records from colonial Virginia state he was born in London, England in 1613. The Hotten Records state "Ralph Hunt, age 22, by authority of certificate issued by the Minister of Gravesend, sailed from England to Virginia aboard the "Primrose" on July 27, 1635" and was granted a land patent in the colony of Virginia on November 28, 1645 in Elizabeth City County.  The first record of his arrival to Long Island is dated 1652 amongst a company of Englishmen from the Virginia colony.  He was an early leader in Middleburgh, where he served as a magistrate, freeholder, and later a Lieutenant for the British Crown.  During this time he also negotiated the sale of Middleburg from the local Indian tribes. Colonial sources record his marriage to Elizabeth Jessup.  During the British takeover of New York, Ralph Hunt raised a force against the Dutch and showed his support of a British government.  When the Dutch left New York, he surveyed for the new town.  His descendants moved to New Jersey and eventually the whole nation. He had six children. (Ann Hunt, Edward Hunt, Mary Hunt, Ralph Hunt Jr, John Hunt, & Samuel Hunt)

References

The Hunt Family Book

External links
 Hunt Genealogy (This link does not work)
 Information on Ralph Hunt
 http://freepages.genealogy.rootsweb.ancestry.com/~tompkins/manuscripts/manuscripts_hopewell.html Roots Web Free Pages

History of New York (state)